Direct presidential elections were held for the first time in Bulgaria on 12 January 1992, with a second round on 19 January. The result was a victory for incumbent President Zhelyu Zhelev of the Union of Democratic Forces, who won 52.8% of the vote in the second round. Voter turnout was 75.4% in the first round and 75.9% in the second. Zhelev had originally been elected as President by the Grand National Assembly in 1990.

Results

References

Bulgaria
President
Presidential elections in Bulgaria
January 1992 events in Europe